Miguel Magno (28 March 1951 – 17 August 2009) was a Brazilian actor, director and author. He acted in theater and television. He was known for playing female roles.

Theater 
Magno played eleven different women characters in the play Quem tem medo de Itália Fausta (Who's Afraid of Itália Fausta?). He had a consistent theatrical career. In addition to acting he also was director and playwright. Furthermore he co-founded the Teatro Orgânico Aldebarã, in the 1970s.

Television 
In addition to theater he participated in several telenovelas and sitcoms. One of his most striking characters was on A Lua me Disse, of Rede Globo, where he portrayed a crossdresser called Dona Roma. In 2009 Miguel Magno was invited by Miguel Falabella to play another woman: Dr. Perci of Toma Lá, Dá Cá.

Death 
The actor died on 17 August 2009, as a result of a cancer at the age of 58. He had been hospitalized since July in the Hospital Paulistano.

Artistic career

Theater 
 1975 – A Cidade dos Artesãos, by Tatiana Belinky.
 1978 – Do Outro Lado do Espelho, adaptation of Magno in partnership with Ricardo Almeida in Alice in Wonderland of Lewis Carroll
 1979 – Souzalândia, by Antônio Francisco and Roberto Lage
 1979 – Quem Tem Medo de Itália Fausta?, of his own in partnership with actor Ricardo Almeida. Under the direction of Roberto Lage and Celso Frateschi. The spectacle had plenty of pumping assemblies and since then, including the well known Cia. Baiana de Patifaria, which took the name of A Bofetada.
 1992 – Porca Miséria, by Jandira Martini and Marcos Caruso, under the direction of. In the cast: Jandira Martini, Marcos Caruso, Myriam Muniz, Renato Consorte and Regina Galdino.
 1995 – Cinco X Comédia
 2004 – O Que Leva Bofetadas

Television 
 2009 – Toma Lá, Dá Cá .... Dra. Perci
 2008 – Queridos Amigos .... Dorival
 2007 – A Diarista .... Amintas Possolo / Marcelinho
 2005 – A Lua Me Disse .... Dona Roma
 2004 – A Diarista .... Amintas Possolo / Marcelinho
 2003 – Os Normais .... dentist
 2002 – Sabor da Paixão .... Aloisio
 2001 – O Direito de Nascer .... commander
 2001 – Estrela-Guia .... Romeu
 1996 – Dona Anja .... Neco
 1991 – Felicidade .... Lucas
 1990 – A História de Ana Raio e Zé Trovão .... Billy
 1989 – Top Model .... Marvin Gaye
 1987 – Helena .... Rodolfo

Movies 
 2006 – Irma Vap .... Camila's father
 2002 – Lara .... Henrique

References

Other websites 
 

Brazilian LGBT actors
Brazilian male writers
Brazilian male stage actors
Deaths from cancer in São Paulo (state)
Male actors from São Paulo
Writers from São Paulo
1951 births
2009 deaths
20th-century Brazilian LGBT people
21st-century Brazilian LGBT people